48 species of amphibians (class Amphibia) are known to inhabit the state of West Virginia. The ranges of some 34 salamander species and 14 species of frogs and toads extend into some portion of the state. Two of these — the Cheat Mountain salamander and West Virginia spring salamander — are endemic to West Virginia; they are the only vertebrate species found only within the state.  The former species is considered threatened and the latter is considered endangered by federal authorities. Many of West Virginia's amphibian species are declining in population due to habitat destruction and water pollution.

The taxa
The following letters indicate the likelihood of finding each animal in West Virginia:

In addition, the IUCN classifies one of these species as endangered  and six as near-threatened .

Order Caudata (salamanders)
Family Cryptobranchidae (giant salamanders)
 Eastern hellbender (Cryptobranchus a. alleganiensis) C, 

Family Proteidae (waterdogs and mudpuppies)
 Common mudpuppy (Necturus m. maculosus) C

Family Ambystomatidae (mole salamanders)
 Jefferson salamander (Ambystoma jeffersonianum) U
 Spotted salamander (Ambystoma maculatum) C
 Marbled salamander (Ambystoma opacum) C
 Small-mouth salamander (Ambystoma texanum) R
 Streamside salamander (Ambystoma barbouri) R, 

Family Salamandridae (true salamanders)
 Red-spotted newt (Notophthalmus v. viridescens) C

Family Plethodontidae (lungless salamanders)
 Dusky salamander (Desmognathus fuscus) C
 Allegheny Mountain dusky salamander (Desmognathus ochrophaeus) C
 Seal salamander (Desmognathus monticola) C
 Black mountain salamander (Desmognathus welteri) U
 Blackbelly salamander (Desmognathus quadramaculatus) U
 Red-backed salamander (Plethodon cinereus) C
 Ravine salamander (Plethodon richmondi) C
 Northern ravine salamander (Plethodon electromorphus) C
 Valley and ridge salamander (Plethodon hoffmani) C
 Shenandoah Mountain salamander (Plethodon virginia) U, 
 Cumberland Plateau salamander (Plethodon kentucki) C
 Cheat Mountain salamander (Plethodon nettingi) R, 
 Northern slimy salamander (Plethodon glutinosus) C
 White-spotted slimy salamander (Plethodon cylindraceus) C
 Wehrle's salamander (Plethodon wehrlei) C
 White-spotted salamander (Plethodon punctatus) U, 
 Four-toed salamander (Hemidactylium scutatum) C
 Northern spring salamander (Gyrinophilus p. porphyriticus) C
 Kentucky spring salamander (Gyrinophilus porphyriticus duryi) C
 West Virginia spring salamander (Gyrinophilus subterraneus) R, 
 Midland mud salamander (Pseudotriton montanus diastictus) U
 Northern red salamander (Pseudotriton r. ruber) C
 Green salamander (Aneides aeneus) U, 
 Southern two-lined salamander (Eurycea cirrigera) C
 Northern two-lined salamander (Eurycea bislineata) C
 Long-tailed salamander (Eurycea l. longicauda) C
 Spotted-tail salamander (Eurycea lucifuga) U

Order Anura (frogs)
Family Scaphiopodidae (American spadefoot toads)
 Eastern spadefoot (Scaphiopus holbrookii) R

Family Bufonidae (true toads)
 Eastern American toad (Anaxyrus a. americanus) C
 Fowler's toad (Anaxyrus fowleri) C

Family Hylidae (tree frogs and allies)
 Eastern cricket frog (Acris c. crepitans) U
 Blanchard's cricket frog (Acris crepitans blanchardi) R
 Gray tree frog (Hyla versicolor) C
 Cope's gray tree frog (Hyla chrysoscelis) C
 Mountain chorus frog (Pseudacris brachyphona) C
 Upland chorus frog (Pseudacris feriarum) U
 Northern spring peeper (Pseudacris c. crucifer) C

Family Ranidae (true frogs)
 American bullfrog (Lithobates catesbeianus) C
 Northern green frog (Lithobates clamitans melanota) C
 Wood frog (Lithobates sylvaticus) C
 Northern leopard frog (Lithobates pipiens) U
 Pickerel frog (Lithobates palustris) C

See also
 Lists of amphibians by region
West Virginia State Wildlife Center, a small zoo featuring native West Virginia animals
Fauna of West Virginia
List of West Virginia wildlife management areas

References

West Virginia
Amphibians
West Virginia
Amphibians